Class D is a class of airspace in the United States which follows International Civil Aviation Organization (ICAO) air space designation. Class D airspace areas are designed to improve aviation safety by reducing the risk of mid-air collisions with a control tower. Aircraft operating in these airspace areas are subject to certain operating rules and equipment requirements.

United States

See also
 List of Class B airports in the United States
 List of Class C airports in the United States

References

Class D